Holy Beasts is a 2019 Dominican drama film directed by Laura Amelia Guzmán and Israel Cárdenas. It was selected as the Dominican entry for the Best International Feature Film at the 94th Academy Awards.

Cast
 Geraldine Chaplin as Vera
 Udo Kier as Henry

See also
 List of submissions to the 94th Academy Awards for Best International Feature Film
 List of Dominican submissions for the Academy Award for Best International Feature Film

References

External links
 

2019 films
2019 drama films
Dominican Republic drama films
2010s Spanish-language films